The 1872 Grand National was the 34th renewal of the Grand National horse race that took place at Aintree near Liverpool, England, in 1872.

Finishing Order

Non-finishers

References

 1872
Grand National
Grand National
19th century in Lancashire
March 1872 sports events